Chancers could refer to 

Chancers (film), a BBC documentary set in Braidwood, South Lanarkshire
Chancers (novel), a novel by Gerald Vizenor